Sarah Zar, born Sarah Gonek, is an American visual artist, songwriter, performance artist, curator, and musical saw player. She has been publishing writing, showing art, and performing music in New York and elsewhere since 1998.  She is the granddaughter of Rose Zar.

Music 
Sarah Zar is a founding member of Row Raven Row and Torcher Chamber Ensemble, as well as musical saw player with singers Shayfer James and Yula Beeri.  She occasionally makes guest appearances with  Crooks & Perverts, and Dolchnakov Brigade.

Her collaborations include combinations of saw playing/ song writing/ singing with Shayfer James of the band Shayfer James, Yula Beeri of Yula & The Extended Family (formerly of The World Inferno Friendship Society, Nanuchka, and Star Fucking Hipsters), Shlomi Lavie of Marcy Playground and Dolchnakov Brigade, Ryder Cooley of Fall Harbor, Torcher Chamber Ensemble, Crooks and Perverts, and many others.

Yula & The Extended Family 
The music and arts collective Yula & The Extended Family (YXFM), founded by Yula Beeri is an ever-morphing poetic tribe based at The Hive NYC in Brooklyn. The group's members not only produce music but also theater, film, photography, painting, literature, horticulture, honey, and more.

Current members of The Extended Family include Yula Beeri (vocals, guitar, bass, keyboards, accordion, and more), Isaac Gardner (drums, theater), Kevin Taylor (trombone, accordion), Sarah Zar (musical saw, painting, graphic design), Kate Campbell (trumpet, film), Rob Meyer (trombone, horticulture), and Daniel J. Gerstle of HELO Magazine(bass, guitar, literature, photography). Former members include Stefan Zeniuk, Taylor Galassi, and others.

The band has released two albums: Victor, and Dark Side of the Bee''. They include the singles "Yulix", "Back Off America", and "Mouthful of Diamonds." In 2010, the band performed both at the SXSW Festival and Punk Island NYC.

Shayfer James 
Shayfer James is a self-titled singer/ songwriter project. Shayfer James' recent performances have been in New York, New Orleans, and Hong Kong.  "When Shayfer James approaches the piano, there is a certain power and mischievous charm that surrounds him. A bewitching sense of foreboding builds as his fingers touch the piano, and as he begins to sing, we are immersed in his darkly lyrical and evocative stories. His wry poetry is stitched seamlessly to peculiar arrangements that are simultaneously unsettling and familiar. Mr. James lures us into a devious world where the gods tear wings from angels and every man has a siren waiting to devour him."

Current members of Shayfer James include Dusty Bones (drums, percussion), Jeremy Gillespie (bass, vocals), Dante Portella (organ), with occasional appearances by Sarah Zar (musical saw, backing vocals) and Peter Horn (violin).

Torcher Chamber Ensemble 
The Torcher Chamber Ensemble is a collection of predominantly classically trained musicians. They play their own compositions and arrangements in the style of a classical chamber ensemble (having a brass and strings section). The members of The Torcher Chamber Ensemble consist of Kevin Taylor, Russell Lynch, Sarah Zar, Kate Campbell, Robert Meyer, Michael Cuttitta, and Jack Noble.

Art 
Sarah Zar is an interdisciplinary artist, currently perched in Brooklyn, NY*.  Her work has appeared in places (Sloan Fine Art, Denise Bibro Fine Art, Janet Kurnatowski Gallery, Sideshow Gallery under bridges and on boats, The Highline Ballroom, and so on)  and sensory organs around the world.  Her paintings have received numerous awards in NY, and her other visual works range from installations, drawings, collages and sculptures to spatial design and letters to strangers.  She is currently teaching Contemporary Art and Aesthetics at Montclair State University.

This means that Sarah Zar is a northern-dwelling, migratory "bird". It traditionally creates novels by painting, and their titles and relationships are nomadic. This species is noted for its colorful use of dream logic.

Writing 
Sarah Zar's writing was first published by Norm Davis in Hazmat Literary Review in 1998, and has appeared in print and in person since then in publications and writing events such as: 
 Zar, Sarah, and Charles Whymper. Riddled With Spots. 1st ed. New York: A. Keck, NY. Print.
 ONandOnScreen
 The Kelly Writers House, Where she was a Featured Visitor (Subject: "The language of technology in contemporary post-modern fiction for 'After David Foster Wallace'")

Awards 
Graduate Citation – Montclair State University
First Place in the Fence Select Exhibition, Arts Center of Troy – Troy, NY
The Roanne Kulakoff Award for Painting – Albany, NY
Art Departmental Award for Drawing and Painting – S.U.N.Y. Albany
Presidential Scholarship and University Honors Scholarship – S.U.N.Y. Albany
Bradley Smith Art Purchase Award for Sculpture – Rochester, NY
Grant for a 2-year Caste Drawing Apprenticeship with Lori Harpole – Rochester, NY

References

External links
 Gallery * Sarah Zar
 Sarah Zar | Other from Brooklyn, NY
 Yula and the eXtended Family music, videos, stats, and photos
 Shayfer James

20th-century American painters
21st-century American painters
Living people
American women songwriters
American performance artists
Year of birth missing (living people)
Place of birth missing (living people)
American women painters
20th-century American women artists
21st-century American women artists